Bader Al-Nakhli (born 20 May 1988) is a football (soccer) player who plays as a defender.

Career statistics

Honours

Al Fateh
 Saudi Premier League: 2012-13
 Saudi Super Cup: 2013

Al-Ittihad
Saudi Crown Prince Cup: 2016–17
King Cup: 2018

Al-Khaleej 
First Division: 2021–22

References

External links 
 

1988 births
Living people
Saudi Arabian footballers
Saudi Arabia international footballers
Association football defenders
Al-Qadsiah FC players
Al Nassr FC players
Al-Fateh SC players
Ittihad FC players
Al Batin FC players
Al-Adalah FC players
Khaleej FC players
Al-Rawdhah Club players
Place of birth missing (living people)
Saudi Professional League players
Saudi First Division League players
Saudi Second Division players
Saudi Arabian Shia Muslims